Field metabolic rate (FMR) refers to a measurement of the metabolic rate of a free-living animal.

Method 
Measurement of the Field metabolic rate is made using the doubly labeled water method, although alternative techniques, such as monitoring heart rates, can also be used. The advantages and disadvantages of the alternative approaches have been reviewed by Butler, et al. Several summary reviews have been published.

References

Metabolism
Biological concepts
Temporal rates